CDNF may refer to:

 Canonical disjunctive normal form, a form of expression in Boolean algebra
 Cerebral dopamine neurotrophic factor, a protein encoded by the CDNF gene